Phaneropsolidae is a family of trematodes belonging to the order Plagiorchiida.

Genera:
 Microtrema Sitko, 2013
 Mosesia Travassos, 1928

References

Plagiorchiida